555 17th Street, formerly known as the Anaconda Tower and the Qwest Tower, is a skyscraper in Denver, Colorado. The building stands as the seventh-tallest building in Denver and Colorado. It also stood as the tallest building in the city at the time of its 1978 completion, and held that distinction for three years until it was surpassed by the  707 17th Street in 1981.

555 17th Street was originally known as the Anaconda Tower, after the Anaconda Company who relocated their headquarters from New York City to Denver in 1978. The building became the world headquarters of Qwest in 1997, at which point it was adorned with two large Qwest signs. The building served as Qwest's headquarters until 2000, when the corporation moved to 1801 California Street, the second-tallest building in Denver situated two blocks away. Although Qwest moved its headquarters in 2000, the two brightly lit blue signs on 555 17th Street remained in place for four more years. Qwest finally removed the logos in 2004, but prior to that the signs were left dark for several months.

555 17th Street is composed entirely of Class A office space, containing features such as a tenants' restaurant, private club, and conference center. The building is home to the offices of accounting firm RSM US LLP. Holland & Hart, a major law firm, has its headquarters in 555 17th Street.

555 17th Street has been installed with several environmentally "green" features, including a 600-ton flat plate heat exchanger and electronic ballast lighting technology. The building's management company, Mile High Properties, estimates that the upgraded features have generated savings of US$$1,835,000 in five years. Due to its green features, 555 17th Street has been designated a "Labeled Building" by Energy Star and the United States Environmental Protection Agency.

Cushman And Wakefield is the current property manager. 555 17th Street has the same owners as the Grand Hyatt.

Tenants
Ogilvy PR Worldwide  - Third floor

Huron Consulting Group - 16th Floor

JWT - Third floor

Clarity Media Group - Seventh floor

Examiner.com - Fourth floor

Parsons Brinckerhoff - Fourth, Fifth and Sixth floors

Grand Hyatt Denver - 2nd and 38th Floor

Long View Systems - 16th Floor

RSM US, LLP  - Eleventh and Twelfth floor

CDM Smith, Inc.  - Tenth floor

Planisware - 17th floor

Crescent Point Energy Corp. - 18th and 19th floors

Willis Towers Watson - 20th and 21st floors

Anschutz Corporation - Twenty-fourth 23, and 22nd floor

Monticello Associates - Twenty-sixth floor

Holland & Hart LLP - Law Firm - 32nd-25th floor

Deloitte & Touche LLP - thirty-third, thirty-fifth, thirty-sixth floors

Gordon and Rees - 34th floor

Cushman & Wakefield - 7th floor

Starbucks - In lobby

FedEx- In Lobby

Snarf's Sandwiches - In Lobby

See also
List of tallest buildings in Denver

References

Skyscraper office buildings in Denver
Telecommunications company headquarters in the United States
Skidmore, Owings & Merrill buildings
Office buildings completed in 1978
Leadership in Energy and Environmental Design basic silver certified buildings